Carlyle Greenwell (16 March 1884 – 7 February 1961) was an Australian architect whose houses, designed in the first half of the 20th century, are often heritage-listed. He was also a philanthropist who made  bequests to the University of Sydney funding research in Anthropology and Archaeology.

Early life

Greenwell was born in Windsor, New South Wales, the son of Australian-born Emma Amelia Greenwell (née Johnston 1847-1922)
and English-born Smith Thomas Greenwell  (1831-1913). He was educated at Newington College (1897–1901).

Architectural career
Greenwell studied architecture at Sydney Technical College before there was a university  architecture course available in Sydney but also attended architecture lectures in the Engineering Faculty at University of Sydney. In the 1910s Australian and North American architecture became more aligned when the English-born architect and designer James Peddle arrived in Pasadena. He was determined to learn all he could in California by working there. Several Australian architects had already made study trips to the United States before this time and, as John Horbury Hunt’s houses demonstrate, North American architectural trends had had an impact on Australian practice as early as the 1870s. In the 1890s Richardsonian Romanesque, based on an Australian interpretation of Henry Hobson Richardson’s Stick Style and Richardsonian commercial building, had also made a brief splash in Sydney and Melbourne. In the early 1900s, some Australians gained scholarships to attend the School of Architecture at the University of Pennsylvania, then considered “the greatest one of them all” by  John Francis Hennessy who attended in 1909 and 1910. Greenwell attended this Philadelphia program at the University of Pennsylvania and was awarded a B.Sc.(Arch) in 1911. Beaux-Arts training was still the main focus of the department’s program. The minutes of the meeting of The Institute of Architects of New South Wales for 1912 records that “We are pleased that Mr. Jack Hennessy and Mr. Carlyle Greenwell have returned and intend to remain among us”.
Before studying abroad, Greenwell had been articled to the firm of Kent & Budden, and in 1912 he joined them in partnership as Kent Budden & Greenwell. During this time, Greenwell designed a number of substantial homes for family and friends in Strathfield, Killara and Vaucluse. Designs in these suburbs include Milverton on The Boulevarde and a home at 65 Woodside Avenue, Strathfield. They are characteristic of his work in this period and still largely intact. Milverton is now part of the campus of Trinity Prep. Other notable designs showing his distinctive rough-cast stucco columns were at Wilgunyah at 30 Roberts Street, Strathfield, and Terhyn Worthle at 1 Locksley Street, Killara. In 2022 Wilgunyah was altered but its columns remain. In 2012 Terhyn Worthle was substantially demolished. One of the local council’s requirements of the new dwelling was to retain the six large columns at the front. After the heritage delisting by Ku-ring-gai Council of Wintergarden, a five-bedroom home built in 1913 at 21 Lorne Avenue Killara for his brother, this building was demolished in 2015. Other houses by Greenwell at 8 Nyora Street and 5 Locksley Street Killara still stand in 2023. Inversnaid in Gilliver Avenue Vaucluse was built in 1914 but has since been demolished. After the departure of Harry Kent, the firm became known as Budden & Greenwell. In this period, Greenwell designed the Inter-War Gothic-styled Killara Congregational Church, which later became the Killara Uniting Church, the Woolloomooloo Bay Mothers and Wives Memorial to Solders in Woolloomooloo and the Harrison House in Toowoomba. 
In 1931, while in partnership with Jon K. Shirley, Greenwell designed the Norman House at 79 Vaucluse Road, Vaucluse in an interwar Georgian/Mediterranean revival style.

Personal life
At the age of 53, Greenwell married Sibyl Enid Vera Munro Morrison, a divorcee who was the first female practising barrister in New South Wales, at St Stephen's Presbyterian Church on 16 March 1937.

War service
Greenwell served as an Army Officer in both World War I and World War II.

Legacy
Greenwell died at Collaroy, New South Wales, on 7 February 1961. His estate funded the Carlyle Greenwell Research Fund at Sydney University for student research, field work and original literary work in Anthropology. 
A substantial bequest to the Art Gallery of NSW included works by George Lambert, Sydney Long, Kenneth McQueen and John Passmore. 
Over many years he was also a major donor to the Australian Museum.

References

1884 births
1961 deaths
New South Wales architects
Australian philanthropists
Australian Congregationalists
People educated at Newington College
Federation architects
20th-century philanthropists